Jack Stauffer (born December 3, 1945 in New York, New York, U.S.) is an American actor of film, television, and theater.  He is also a director of theater productions.

Stauffer played the original Charles "Chuck" Tyler in All My Children and the character of Lieutenant Bojay in the original Battlestar Galactica.

To date, Stauffer has guest starred on 60 different television shows (mini-series, regular series, and TV movies), "numerous" stage productions, and over 250 commercials.

External links 

 
 Jack Stauffer's official site
 Jack Stauffer @ Battlestar Wiki, an unofficial Wiki on Battlestar Galactica

American male film actors
American male soap opera actors
American male stage actors
People from New York City
American male television actors
American theatre directors
1945 births
Living people